Peter Westerman (12 August 1920 – 3 February 1992) was an English first-class cricketer active 1949–51 who played for Surrey. He was born in East Sheen; died in Hampton, Middlesex.

References

1920 births
1992 deaths
English cricketers
Surrey cricketers
People from East Sheen